Januar Eka Ramadhan (born 31 July 1995) is an Indonesian professional footballer who plays as an forward for Liga 1 club Persebaya Surabaya.

Club career

Badak Lampung
Januar became Badak Lampung's in the 2021–22 Liga 2. Januar made his debut on 4 October 2021 in a match against PSKC Cimahi at the Gelora Bung Karno Madya Stadium, Jakarta. On 29 October, Januar scored his first league goal for Badak Lampung with scored a brace in a 4–1 win over Perserang Serang. On 8 November, he scored in a 3–2 lose over PSKC Cimahi. Until the competition ended, he appeared in 7 matches, and scored 3 goals.

Persebaya Surabaya
He was signed for Persebaya Surabaya and played in Liga 1 in 2022-2023 season. Januar made his league debut on 25 July 2022 in a match against Persikabo 1973 as a substitute for Ahmad Nufiandani in the 80th minute at the Pakansari Stadium, Cibinong.

He scored his first league goal for the side on 13 February 2023 in a 4–2 win with PSS Sleman.

References

External links
 Januar Eka Ramadhan at Soccerway
 Januar Eka Ramadhan at Liga Indonesia

1995 births
Living people
Sportspeople from Banten
Indonesian footballers
Cilegon United players
Badak Lampung F.C. players
Persebaya Surabaya players
Liga 2 (Indonesia) players
Liga 1 (Indonesia) players
Association football forwards